Hentziectypus schullei is a species of comb-footed spider in the family Theridiidae. It is found in Mexico and the United States.

References

Theridiidae
Spiders described in 1936
Spiders of North America